K-107 was a  state highway in the U.S. state of Kansas. K-107's southern terminus was at K-32 in the city of Edwardsville and the northern terminus was at U.S. Route 24 (US-24), US-40 and US-73 west of Kansas City.

Route description

History
K-107 was first designated a state highway in a March 1, 1937 resolution. At that time it ran from K-32 in Edwardsville to K-30. It then continued past here and ended at US-40.

Major intersections

References

External links

Kansas Department of Transportation State Map
KDOT: Historic State Maps

107
U.S. Route 24
U.S. Route 73